Loryma ambovombealis is a species of snout moth in the genus Loryma. It was described by Patrice J.A. Leraut in 2009 and is known from Madagascar (the type location is Ambovombe).

References

Moths described in 2009
Pyralini
Moths of Africa